Ten Canoes is a 2006 Australian drama film directed by Rolf de Heer and Peter Djigirr and starring Crusoe Kurddal. The title of the film arose from discussions between de Heer and David Gulpilil about a photograph of ten canoeists poling across the Arafura Swamp, taken by anthropologist Donald Thomson in 1936. It is the first ever movie entirely filmed in Australian Aboriginal languages. The film is partly in colour and partly in black and white, in docudrama style largely with a narrator explaining the story. The overall format is that of a moral tale.

Synopsis
The film is set in Arnhem Land, in a time separate of Western influence, and tells the story of a group of ten men in a traditional hunting context. The leader of the group, Minygululu, tells the young Dayindi (Jamie Gulpilil) a story about another young man even further back in time who, like Dayindi, coveted his elder brother's youngest wife. The sequences featuring Dayindi and the hunt are in black and white, while shots set in distant past are in colour. All protagonists speak in indigenous languages of the Yolŋu Matha language group, with subtitles. The film is narrated in English by David Gulpilil, although versions of the film without narration, and featuring narration in Yolŋu Matha, are also available.

Minygululu tells a story of the great warrior Ridjimiraril, who suspects a visiting stranger of kidnapping his second wife. In a case of mistaken identity, Ridjimiraril kills a member of a neighbouring tribe. To prevent all-out war, tribal laws dictate that the offending tribe allow the offender to be speared from a distance by individuals of the tribe of the slain man. The offender is allowed to be accompanied by a companion, and in this instance he takes his younger brother, Yeeralparil. Whenever one of the two is hit, the spear-throwers will stop, and justice will have been served. Ridjimiraril is hit and mortally wounded but survives long enough to return to his camp, where he is tended to by his eldest wife. When he knows he is dying he performs a ritual dance and once dead his hair is cut and his body is painted to enable the ancestral spirits to guide him to the next world.

The elder brother's kidnapped second wife then finds her way back to the camp. She reveals that she had been kidnapped by a different tribe, much farther away and had taken this long to return. She mourns her lost husband, who had attacked the wrong tribe, though now she and the elder wife take his younger brother as their new husband. The younger brother, who was only interested in the youngest of the three wives, now has to care for all of them, and satisfying their many demands is clearly going to be much more than he wished.

Minygululu tells this story in the hope that Dayindi learns of the added responsibilities of a husband and elder statesman in the tribe, and in the end we see Dayindi withdrawing from his pursuit of Minygululu's young wife.

Cast and crew
The actors and actresses, mostly from Ramingining in East Arnhem Land, speak various dialects of the Yolngu Matha language family. Crusoe Kurddal is from Maningrida and speaks Kuninjku.

Cast
Crusoe Kurddal – Ridjimiraril
Jamie Gulpilil – Dayindi/Yeeralparil
Richard Birrinbirrin – Birrinbirrin
Peter Minygululu – Minygululu
Frances Djulibing – Nowalingu
David Gulpilil – The Storyteller
Sonia Djarrabalminym – Banalandju
Cassandra Malangarri Baker – Munandjarra
Philip Gudthaykudthay – The Sorcerer
Peter Djigirr – Canoeist/The Victim/Warrior
Michael Dawu – Canoeist/The Stranger
Bobby Bunungurr – Canoeist/Uncle
Johnny Buniyira – Canoeist/Warrior
Gil Birmingham – Canoeist/Warrior
Steven Wilinydjanu Maliburr – Canoeist/Warrior

Reception
Ten Canoes won the Un Certain Regard Special Jury Prize at the 2006 Cannes Film Festival. De Heer rejected claims he is a white director making an Indigenous story: "People talk about, what is a white director doing making an Indigenous story? They're telling the story, largely, and I'm the mechanism by which they can." Ten Canoes was screened at the Sydney Film Festival in June 2006 and was released nationally on 29 June 2006.

In October 2006 Ten Canoes was chosen as Australia's official entry into the Best Foreign Language Film category for the 2007 Academy Awards, thus becoming the third Australian film to be considered for the award (following Floating Life in 1996 and La Spagnola in 2001).

Ten Canoes was nominated for seven Australian Film Institute (AFI) awards, of which it won six. The movie won the awards for Best Picture (Julie Ryan, Rolf de Heer producers), Best Director (Rolf de Heer and Peter Djigirr), Best Screenplay - Original (Rolf de Heer), Best Cinematography (Ian Jones), Best Editing (Tania Nehme), and Best Sound (James Currie, Tom Heuzenroeder, Michael Bakaloff, and Rory McGregor). It was also nominated for Best Production Design (Beverly Freeman).

It won three awards from the Film Critics Circle of Australia: Best Film, Best Editing (Tania Nehme), and Best Cinematography (Ian Jones). (The latter award was a tie with David Williamson's work on Jindabyne.) The film was also nominated for Best Director and Best Original Screenplay. The Balanda and the Bark Canoes, a documentary that aired on Australian network SBS and which detailed de Heer's experiences making the film, won Best Australian Short Documentary for de Heer, Tania Nehme, and Molly Reynolds. The documentary explores the interplay between cultures in a film project immersing a balanda (white man) into the intricacies of kinship systems impacting the casting of the film as well as giving some voice to the inner conflicts of indigenous peoples today caught between the world of their heritage and that of modern life. This aspect has been explored by academic D. Bruno Starrs with regard to the "authentic Aboriginal voice".

At the end of 2006, the film stood as one of the highest grossing Australian films of that year. By October it had made just over $3,000,000 from a budget of $2,200,000.

The film ranked #72 in Empire magazine's "The 100 Best Films of World Cinema" in 2010.

Locations
 Arafura Swamp, Northern Territory, Australia
 Arnhem Land, Northern Territory, Australia
 Ramingining, Northern Territory, Australia

Awards

Box office
Ten Canoes grossed  at the box office in Australia.

Twelve Canoes
After Ten Canoes sparked worldwide interest in Yolngu culture, a spin-off educational project known as Twelve Canoes was born, in collaboration with the people at Ramingining. A website, videos and study guide were created, focussing on twelve key subjects. The film of the twelve segments was shown on SBS TV in Australia, and has been available online.

See also
 Cinema of Australia
 South Australian Film Corporation
 Atanarjuat: The Fast Runner, a 2001 Canadian film entirely in Inuktitut by Inuit actors, also about an ancestral aboriginal legend also involving the sexual jealousy of brothers.

References

External links
 Official website at Palace Films
 
 
Ten Canoes at the National Film and Sound Archive

2006 films
Australian comedy-drama films
Films set in the Northern Territory
Films directed by Rolf de Heer
2006 comedy-drama films
Yolngu
Films about Aboriginal Australians
Films by indigenous directors
Yolngu-language films